Langwarrin South is an official bounded locality in Melbourne, Victoria, Australia, 47 km south-east of Melbourne's Central Business District, located within the City of Frankston local government area. Langwarrin South recorded a population of 1,346 at the 2021 census.

Langwarrin South is bounded in the north by Robinsons Road, in the east by Dandenong-Hastings Road, in the south by Golf Links and Baxter-Tooradin Roads and in the west by the route of the proposed extension of the Mornington Peninsula Freeway.

Mulberry Hill

Langwarrin South is the location of Mulberry Hill, the former home of Daryl Lindsay and writer Joan Lindsay, author of Picnic at Hanging Rock. Joan Lindsay bequeathed the house to the National Trust of Australia. Situated on Golf Links Road, the house is open to the public.

Schools
 Woodleigh School

Sport

Langwarrin South has a soccer club Langwarrin SC competing in the National Premier League which is the third tier of Australian soccer behind the national A-League.

See also
 City of Frankston – Langwarrin South is located within this local government area.
 List of Frankston people – notable people from the City of Frankston (including Langwarrin South).

External links
 Images of Mulberry Hill

References